Sylvie Feucher (née Daniélo; born 26 February 1959 in Brest, France)  is a French civil servant and was the Prefect of Saint-Martin and Saint-Barthélemy from 2018 until 2020.

In 2004 Feucher was Chief Commissioner of the National Police in Versailles. Between 2008 and 2012, Feucher was the Secretary General of trade union of National Police (SCPN). In 2013 Feucher became the Prefect for Equal Opportunities in Val-d'Oise.

On 18 June 2018, Feucher was appointed Prefect of Saint-Martin and Saint-Barthélemy. The islands used to be part of Guadeloupe, however on 7 February 2007 they became an overseas collectivity with a Prefect for both islands to represent the State, but also to handle the non-military aspect of crises. Sylvie Feucher is therefore in charge of the management of the 2020 coronavirus pandemic in French Saint Martin and Saint Barthélemy. Feucher served until 25 December 2020.

References

Living people
1959 births
Saint Barthélemy politicians
Saint Martinois politicians
French civil servants
French trade unionists
French women trade unionists

People from Brest, France
21st-century French women politicians